Dr. Feelgood are an English pub rock band formed in Canvey Island, Essex, in 1971, the group are best known for early singles such as "She Does It Right", "Roxette", "Back in the Night" and "Milk and Alcohol". The group's original distinctively British R&B sound was centred on Wilko Johnson's choppy guitar style. Along with Johnson, the original band line-up included singer Lee Brilleaux and the rhythm section of John B. Sparks, known as "Sparko", on bass guitar and John Martin, known as "The Big Figure", on drums.  Although their most commercially productive years were the early to mid-1970s, and in spite of Brilleaux's death in 1994 of lymphoma, a version of the band (featuring none of the original members) continues to tour and record.

Career

Early years

The band was formed in Canvey Island in 1971 by Johnson, Brilleaux and Sparks, who had all been members of existing R&B bands, and soon added drummer John Martin. They took their name from a 1962 record by the American blues pianist and singer Willie Perryman (also known as "Piano Red") called "Dr. Feel-Good", which Perryman recorded under the name of Dr. Feelgood & The Interns. The song was covered by several British beat groups in the 1960s, including Johnny Kidd & The Pirates.  The term is also a slang term for heroin or for a physician who is willing to overprescribe drugs.

By late 1973, the band's driving R&B influence had made them one of the most popular bands on the growing London pub rock circuit, which included regular appearances at the Lord Nelson music pub venue. They soon recorded their debut album, Down by the Jetty, for United Artists in 1974. Like many pub rock acts, Dr. Feelgood built up a dedicated following and were known primarily for their high energy and intense live performances constantly honed through their touring and regular performances. Their studio albums such as Down by the Jetty and Malpractice (1975) added significantly to their rising popularity. 

Their breakthrough 1976 live album, Stupidity, reached number one in the UK Albums Chart (their only chart-topper). But after the 1977 follow-up Sneakin' Suspicion, Johnson left the group because of conflicts with Lee Brilleaux. He was replaced by Gypie Mayo. The band with Mayo was never as popular as when Johnson was in the line-up yet they went on to enjoy their only top ten hit single in 1979, with "Milk and Alcohol". Johnson, who died in 2022 went on to form the group Solid Senders before joining Ian Dury and The Blockheads in 1980.

Later years
Despite Mayo's departure in 1981, and various subsequent line-up changes which left Brilleaux the only remaining original member, Dr. Feelgood continued touring and recording through the 1980s.  However, the band then suffered an almost career-finishing blow when Brilleaux died of cancer on 7 April 1994.

As Brilleaux had insisted prior to his death, Dr. Feelgood reunited in May 1995, initially with vocalist Pete Gage (not to be confused with guitarist Pete Gage of Geno Washington and Vinegar Joe), and recommenced touring in 1996. Though the band contained no original members at this point, the musicians backing Gage had all previously played as members of Dr. Feelgood for at least five years, and in some cases for over a decade. In 1999, Gage was replaced by Robert Kane, formerly of The Animals II and The Alligators, who celebrated his 1,000th gig as the frontman of Dr. Feelgood in April 2007.

Every year after Brilleaux's death, a special concert known as the Lee Brilleaux Birthday Memorial was held on Canvey Island, where former and current Feelgoods celebrated the music of Dr. Feelgood, and raised money for The Fair Havens Hospice in Westcliff-on-Sea. Fans attended from all over the globe, and the 20th and final event was held on 9 May 2014. Still based in the UK, Dr. Feelgood continue to play across the world, with concerts in 2010 in Austria, Bahrain, Belgium, Finland, France, the Netherlands, Italy, Spain and Switzerland.

Band manager Chris Fenwick organises an annual walk around Canvey to commemorate Brilleaux's life, as well as additional walking tours during which he points out landmarks from the band's career. These include the jetty featured in the photograph on the band's first album cover, and venues where they played early in their career, such as The Lobster Smack inn, The Monico Nightclub and The Canvey Club (disguised as 'The Alibi Club' on the sleeve of the album Sneakin' Suspicion).

A film by Julien Temple about the early days of the band, Oil City Confidential, premiered at the London Film Festival on 22 October 2009, and received a standing ovation. Guest of honour was Lee Brilleaux's mother Joan Collinson, along with his widow Shirley and children Kelly and Nick. All the surviving members of the original band were present along with manager Chris Fenwick, former tour manager and Stiff Records boss Jake Riviera and other friends and colleagues of the band. The film has its own Facebook page.
Reviewing the film for The Independent, Nick Hasted concluded: "Feelgood are remembered in rock history, if at all, as John the Baptists to punk's messiahs". On general release from 1 February 2010, the film was critically well received, with Peter Bradshaw of The Guardian describing it as "...a vivid study of period, music and place". The film was first broadcast on BBC Four in April 2010.

A major exhibition of memorabilia celebrating the band's career ran at The Canvey Club between May and July 2013, having been extended several times.

On 16 June 2021, it was announced that Walwyn was "unavailable to play live shows for the foreseeable future", due to family holiday commitments and the fact that his son has a possible compromised immune system. Later concerts were played by former guitarist Gordon Russell, whom Walwyn had replaced 32 years before.

Members

Current members
Phil H. Mitchell – bass, acoustic guitar, backing vocals 
Kevin Morris – drums, percussion, backing vocals 
Gordon Russell – lead and slide guitars, backing vocals 
Robert Kane – lead vocals, harmonica

Gallery

Discography

Down by the Jetty (1975)
Malpractice (1975)
Stupidity (1976)
Sneakin' Suspicion (1977)
Be Seeing You (1977)
Private Practice (1978)
Let It Roll (1979)
A Case of the Shakes (1980)
Fast Women & Slow Horses (1982)
Doctor's Orders (1984)
Mad Man Blues (1985)
Brilleaux (1986)
Classic (1987)
Primo (1991)
The Feelgood Factor (1993)
On the Road Again (1996)
Chess Masters (2000)
Repeat Prescription (2006)

References

Bibliography
 Jost, Roland; Nättilä, Teppo, Mäkinen, Rauno – From Roxette To Ramona, Dr Feelgood And Wilko Johnson on Record – 
 Down by the Jetty – The Dr Feelgood Story by Tony Moon – Northdown Publishing 1997 (Rev 2002) –

External links
Official website
Wilko Johnson official site
 
Dr. Feelgood biography at Allmusic.com website
2006 interview with Wilko Johnson 
Website of the Julien Temple film on the early years
 

English blues rock musical groups
British pub rock music groups
Canvey Island
Music in Southend-on-Sea
British rhythm and blues musical groups
Musical groups established in 1971
Musical groups from Essex
United Artists Records artists
Stiff Records artists